The Abou Bekr Belkaid University is a university located in Tlemcen, Algeria.

It is ranked by the Times Higher Education between 121 and 140 in the 2022 regional ranking of Arab universities, and 1501+ in the world ranking of universities.

In 2022 the university was ranked 2nd in the national ranking of universities made by the Ministry of Higher Education and Scientific Research in Algeria.

References

 "Search Top Arab Region Universities | US News Best Arab Region Universities" (Retrieved 21 June 2016)
 Historique de l'université, sur son site officiel.
 Facultés & Départements de l'université, sur son site officiel.
 Présentation de l'université, sur son site officiel.

External links
 جامعة أبي بكر بلقابد تلمسان | الرئيسية
 Institute

Abou Bekr Belkaid
Buildings and structures in Tlemcen Province
Educational institutions established in 1974
1974 establishments in Algeria